This is a list of meat substitutes. A meat substitute, also called a meat analogue, approximates certain aesthetic qualities (primarily texture, flavor and appearance) or chemical characteristics of a specific meat. Substitutes are often based on soybeans (such as tofu and tempeh), gluten, or peas. Whole legumes are often used as a protein source in vegetarian dishes, but are not listed here.

Dairy-based

 Glamorgan sausage – a traditional Welsh vegetarian sausage named after the historic county of Glamorgan in Wales.
 Paneer – for example in such dishes as Paneer tikka

Fungi-derived
 Edible mushrooms
 Mycoprotein – a form of single-cell protein, also known as fungal protein, it is able to provide greater satiety than traditional protein sources such as chicken, while also being rich in protein and low in caloric content
 Fistulina hepatica – a common mushroom known as beefsteak fungus
 Laetiporus – a mushroom which is also named chicken of the woods
 Lyophyllum decastes – a mushroom known as fried chicken mushroom
 Pleurotus ostreatus – better known as the oyster mushroom, famous in the vegan community as one of the best substitutes for fried chicken

Fruit-based

 Breadfruit – used similarly as jackfruit in savory dishes
 Coconut burger – made from sapal, the coconut pulp by-products of traditional coconut milk extraction in Filipino cuisine
 Eggplant – semitropical/tropical plant with a highly textured flesh
 Grapefruit – during the course of the Special Period economic crisis Cubans prepared steaks made out of breaded and fried grapefruit rind known as "bistec de toronja".
 Jackfruit – a fruit whose flesh has a similar texture to pulled pork when cooked

Legumes

 Burmese tofu – made from water, chickpea flour and turmeric
 Falafel – a traditional Middle Eastern bean fritter, believed to have been created by ancient Copts as a meat substitute during Lent
 Ganmodoki – a traditional Japanese tofu based dish similar to veggie burgers
 Härkis – a brand of processed ground fava beans

 Injo-gogi-bap – a Korean steamed rice wrapped in leftover soybean paste and dressed with a chili sauce.
 Koya dofu – a freeze-dried tofu that has a taste and texture similar to meat when prepared, common in Buddhist vegetarian cuisine
 Oncom – one of the traditional staple foods of West Java (Sundanese) cuisine of Indonesia, there are two types: red oncom and black oncom. Oncom is closely related to tempeh; both are foods fermented using mold.
 Seitan – a food made from gluten
 Soy protein – a protein that is isolated from soybeans, it is made from soybean meal that has been dehulled and defatted
 Soy curls – made from dehydrated soy beans. Often used as a substitute of chicken
 Soy pulp – used for veggie burgers and croquettes
 Tempeh – a traditional Indonesian soy product in a cake form, made from fermented soybeans

 Textured vegetable protein – a defatted soy flour product that is a by-product of extracting soybean oil. It is often used as a meat analogue or meat extender. It is quick to cook, with a protein content that is comparable to certain meats.
 Tofu – not traditionally seen as a meat substitute in Asia, but widely used for that purpose in the Western hemisphere
 Tofurkey – faux turkey, a meat substitute in the form of a loaf or casserole of vegetarian protein, usually made from tofu (soybean protein) or seitan (wheat protein) with a stuffing made from grains or bread, flavored with a broth and seasoned with herbs and spices
 Vegan chicken nuggets – made from pea protein, soy protein, textured vegetable protein, and wheat gluten
 Vegetarian bacon – sometimes made from tempeh.
 Vegetarian hot dog 
 Vegetarian sausage
 Veggie burger

Others
 Carrot hot dog
Cauliflower – coated in flour and baked or fried to imitate chicken wings or steak
Cultured meat
 Leaf protein concentrate
 Meat extenders – sometimes but not always soy-based
 Mock duck
 Nut roast
 Wheat gluten

Companies and brands

 Amy's Kitchen
 Beanfeast (Batchelors)
 Beyond Meat
 Boca Burger
 Dr. Praeger's
 Fry Group Foods
 Gardein
 Gardenburger
 Goshen Alimentos
 Impossible Foods
 LightLife
 Linda McCartney Foods
 Meatless Farm
 Morningstar Farms
 Nature's Fynd
 Quorn
 Solar Foods Ltd.
 TerraVia
 Tofurky (Turtle Island Foods)
 v2food

See also

 Cheese analogue
 List of bacon substitutes
 List of fermented soy products
 List of vegetarian and vegan companies
 Veganism
 Vegetarian food

References

External links
 

Imitation foods
Lists of foods by type